The 47th New York Infantry Regiment was an infantry regiment in the Union Army during the American Civil War.

Service
The 47th New York Infantry was organized at New York City, New York and mustered in for three years service on September 14, 1861, under the command of Colonel Henry Moore.

The regiment was attached to Viele's 1st Brigade, Sherman's South Carolina Expeditionary Corps, to April 1862. 2nd Brigade, 2nd Division, Department of the South, to July 1862. District of Hilton Head, South Carolina, X Corps, Department of the South, to April 1863. Ossabaw Sound and Folly Island, South Carolina, to July 1863. Folly Island, South Carolina, X Corps, to August 1863. 5th Brigade, Morris Island, South Carolina, X Corps, to October 1863. Unattached, Folly Island, South Carolina, to November 1863. District of Hilton Head, South Carolina, to December 1863. Barton's Brigade, District of Hilton Head, South Carolina, to February 1864. Barton's Brigade, District of Florida, February 1864. Barton's Brigade, Ames' Division, District of Florida, to April 1864. 2nd Brigade, 2nd Division, X Corps, Army of the James, Department of Virginia and North Carolina, to May 1864. 1st Brigade, 3rd Division, XVIII Corps, to June 1864. 2nd Brigade, 2nd Division, X Corps, to December 1864. 2nd Brigade, 2nd Division, XXIV Corps, to January 1865. 2nd Brigade, 2nd Division, Terry's Provisional Corps, Department of North Carolina, to March 1865. 2nd Brigade, 2nd Division, X Corps, Department of North Carolina, to July 1865. Department of North Carolina to August 1865.

The 47th New York Infantry mustered out of service on August 30, 1865.

Detailed service
Moved to Washington, D.C., then to Annapolis, Md., September 1861. Expedition to Port Royal, S.C., October 21-November 7, 1861. Capture of Forts Wagner and Beauregard, Port Royal Harbor, S.C., November 7. Hilton Head, S.C., November 7–8. Port Royal Ferry, Coosaw River, January 1, 1862. Reconnaissance to Wright River February 6. Siege operations against Fort Pulaski, Ga., February 11-April 11. Bombardment and capture of Fort Pulaski April 10–11. Expedition to James Island, S.C., June 1–28. Action on James Island June 10. Battle of Secessionville June 16. Evacuation of James Island and movement to Hilton Head, S.C., June 28-July 7. Hilton Head, S.C., until April 1863. Duty at Ossabaw Island and Folly Island, S.C., until July. Siege operations against Forts Wagner and Gregg, Morris Island, S.C., July 18-September 7. Bombardment of Fort Sumter and Charleston August 17–23. Operations against Charleston and duty on Folly Island, S.C., until December, and at Hilton Head, S.C., until February 1864. Expedition to Jacksonville, Fla., February 5–7. Occupation of Jacksonville February 7. Expedition into central Florida February 7–22. Battle of Olustee February 20. Occupation of Palatka March 10. Duty at Jacksonville until April. Moved to Gloucester Point, Va., April 22–28. Butler's operations on south side of the James River and against Petersburg and Richmond May 4–28. Port Walthall Junction, Chester Station, May 7. Operations against Fort Darling May 12–14. Battle of Drury's Bluff May 14–16. Bermuda Hundred May 16–28. Moved to White House, then to Cold Harbor May 28-June 1. Battles about Cold Harbor June 1–12. Before Petersburg June 15–18. Siege operations against Petersburg and Richmond June 16 to December 7, 1864. Demonstration on north side of the James River August 13–20. Strawberry Plains, Deep Bottom, August 14–18. Chaffin's Farm, New Market Heights, September 28–30. Fair Oaks October 27–28. Expedition to Fort Fisher, N.C., December 7–25. 2nd Expedition to Fort Fisher, N.C., January 3–15, 1865. Assault and capture of Fort Fisher January 15. Cape Fear entrenchment's February 11–12. Sugar Loaf Battery February 11. Fort Anderson February 18–20. Capture of Wilmington February 22. Carolinas Campaign March 1-April 26. Advance on Kinston and Goldsboro March 6–21. Advance on Raleigh April 9–14. Bennett's House April 26. Surrender of Johnston and his army. Duty at Raleigh and in the Department of North Carolina until August.

Casualties
The regiment lost a total of 237 men during service; 7 officers and 70 enlisted men killed or mortally wounded, and 160 enlisted men died of disease.

Commanders
 Colonel Henry Moore
 Colonel James L. Fraser
 Colonel Christopher R. MacDonald

Notable members
 Sergeant Richard Gasson, Company K - Medal of Honor recipient for action at the Battle of Chaffin's Farm

See also

 List of New York Civil War regiments
 New York in the Civil War

References
 Dyer, Frederick H. A Compendium of the War of the Rebellion (Des Moines, IA:  Dyer Pub. Co.), 1908.
Attribution
 

Military units and formations established in 1861
Military units and formations disestablished in 1865
Infantry 047
1861 establishments in New York (state)